Gethin David L. Anthony (born 9 October 1983) is an English television and film actor best known for his role as Renly Baratheon in Game of Thrones from 2011 to 2012.

Early life and education
Anthony was born in Stratford-upon-Avon, Warwickshire.

He attended Ashton Hayes Primary School in Ashton Hayes, Cheshire, Christ Church Primary School in New Malden, and the Tiffin School in Kingston-Upon-Thames. He received a scholarship for a summer programme at the British American Drama Academy in London from July to August 2004.

Anthony went on to study English Literature at Oxford University's Balliol College, appeared in numerous student productions (notably in the title role of Cyrano de Bergerac at the Oxford Playhouse), and was President of the Oxford University Dramatic Society, before training at London Academy of Music and Dramatic Art.

Career
Anthony played Grigory in Boris Godunov at the Royal Shakespeare Company in Stratford-upon-Avon from November 2012 to March 2013.

He had guest roles in the series Ten Days to War and Doctors, and played William in the 2014 film Copenhagen. His most notable roles are Renly Baratheon in the HBO series Game of Thrones and Charles Manson in the NBC series Aquarius. In 2017, he voiced the character of Gil Brodie in the video game Mass Effect: Andromeda, and appeared in a play A Lie of the Mind at Southwark Playhouse in London with Robert Lonsdale and Kate Fahy.

Filmography

Films

Television

Video games

Stage
Theatre 503/Latitude's Carrot as Alex  
Theatre Royal Northampton's In Praise of Love as Joey 
High Tide/Old Vic Tunnels's Ditch as James 
Birmingham Rep Theatre's Cling to Me Like Ivy as Patrick  
Hampstead Theatre's What Fatima Did as George  
The Old Red Lion's Fairytale
Tristan Bates Theatre's Death of Cool as Richie 
Old Vic's 24 Hour Plays
Old Fire Station's Some Voices as Ray  
Oxford Playhouse's Cyrano de Bergerac as Cyrano
Swan Theatre, Stratford-upon-Avon's Boris Godunov as Grigoriy Otrepyev, later Dmitriy, the Pretender

Audio
BBC Radio 4's Small Acts of Kindness as Charlie 
BBC Radio 4's Severed Threads as Jones  
Radio Static's The Minister of Chance as Sutu  
BBC's Legsy Gets a Break as John
Big Finish Productions's The Year of Martha Jones as Mr Strand

References

External links

Interview with Shadowlocked.com

Living people
1983 births
21st-century English male actors
Alumni of Balliol College, Oxford
Alumni of the London Academy of Music and Dramatic Art
English male film actors
English male radio actors
English male stage actors
English male television actors
English male video game actors
English male voice actors
Male actors from Warwickshire
People from Stratford-upon-Avon